25th National Board of Review Awards
Late December, 1953
The 25th National Board of Review Awards were announced in late December, 1953.

Top Ten Films 
Julius Caesar
Shane
From Here to Eternity
Martin Luther
Lili
Roman Holiday
Stalag 17
The Little Fugitive
Mogambo
The Robe

Top Foreign Films 
A Queen is Crowned
Moulin Rouge
The Little World of Don Camillo
Strange Deception
The Conquest of Everest

Winners 
Best Film: Julius Caesar
Best Foreign Film: A Queen is Crowned
Best Actor: James Mason (Face to Face, The Desert Rats, The Man Between, Julius Caesar)
Best Actress: Jean Simmons (Young Bess, The Robe, The Actress)
Best Director: George Stevens (Shane)

External links 
National Board of Review of Motion Pictures :: Awards for 1953

1953
1953 film awards
1953 in American cinema
1953 awards in the United States
December 1953 events in the United States